James Jerauld Reeves (born October 11, 1938) is a politician in the American state of Florida. He served in the Florida House of Representatives from 1966 to November 7, 1972, representing the 4th district.

References

1938 births
Living people
Members of the Florida House of Representatives